Operation Oregon was a US Marine Corps operation that took place on the Street Without Joy approximately 36 km northwest of Huế, lasting from 19 to 23 March 1966.

Prelude
On 17 March the Army of the Republic of Vietnam (ARVN) 1st Division had killed more than 50 soldiers of the Viet Cong 804th Battalion in the area south of the district capital of Phong Điền. The ARVN command requested the Marines to mount an operation 8 km north of Phong Điền. The operation plan called for Companies A and B of the 1st Battalion 4th Marines to be landed by helicopters north and south of Route 597 and then move 4 km southeast to sweep the hamlets of Ap Phu An and Ap Tay Hoang which were believed to be held by the Viet Cong 802nd Battalion. The 2nd Battalion 1st Marines would reinforce if enemy was engaged. The operation was supposed to be launched on 19 March but bad weather forced a postponement to 20 March.

Operation

20 March
The landing of the 1/4 Marines was delayed for 4 hours due to fog, by 10:15 the helicopters of HMM-163 were over the landing zones but were met with anti-aircraft fire. Due to low cloud air support was unavailable, but artillery fire from the 4th Battalion, 12th Marines at Phong Điền softened up the landing zones and the Marines started landing by 12:55. As the Marines began to move out from Landing Zone Robin Company B moved into a minefield around the hamlet of Ap Chinh An 800 km from Landing Zone Robin wounding 1 Marine. The Marines attempted to take the hamlet but found that the Viet Cong had fortified the entire hamlet with bunkers and barbed wire. The Marines withdrew to allow air, artillery and naval gunfire support to hit the Viet Cong positions. At 16:49 Company E was landed to reinforce the Marines but by the evening the attack was halted, the Marines had suffered 9 dead and 41 wounded.

21 March
Marine artillery bombarded the Viet Cong positions while dense fog delayed planned airstrikes. The 1/4 Marines captured Ap Chinh An with minimal opposition as the Viet Cong had abandoned their positions during the night. 2/1 Marines was landed at Landing Zone Duck 3 km west of LZ Robin at 11:15 encountering no resistance. The operation continued for the next 2 days with no further engagements.

Aftermath
Operation Oregon concluded on 23 March, the Marines had suffered 11 dead and 45 wounded and claiming that the Vietcong 48 killed and 8 captured.

Notes

Conflicts in 1966
1966 in Vietnam
Battles involving the United States
Battles involving Vietnam
March 1966 events
Battles and operations of the Vietnam War in 1966
United States Marine Corps in the Vietnam War
History of Thừa Thiên Huế province